Murakawa (written: 村川 lit. "village river") is a Japanese surname. Notable people with the surname include:

, Japanese Go player
, Japanese actress
Naomi Murakawa, American political scientist
, Japanese film director
, Japanese screenwriter

Japanese-language surnames